Lifsey is an unincorporated community in Pike County, in the U.S. state of Georgia.

History
The community was named after its founder, James Samuel "Tony" Lifsey. Variant names are "Lifsey Springs" and "Lifseys Store". A post office called Lifsey's Store was established in 1878, the name was shortened to Lifsey in 1891, and the post office closed in 1907.

References

Unincorporated communities in Pike County, Georgia